State Route 217 (SR 217) is an east–west state highway in the southern portion of the U.S. state of Ohio. The route mainly passes through some hilly terrain and drops in elevation before reaching the Ohio River valley.

Route description
State Route 217 runs exclusively within Lawrence County.  No segment of the route is incorporated within the National Highway System, a system of highways important for the country's economy, mobility and defense.

History
Making its debut in 1924, State Route 217 has followed the same general routing between State Route 141 and State Route 7 from its inception to the present day.  It has not experienced any major changes to its alignment since it was established.

Major intersections

References

External links

State Route 217 Endpoint Photos

217
Transportation in Lawrence County, Ohio